Marcela Pavia (born 1957) is an Italian-American composer.

Life
Marcela Pavia was born in Argentina of Italian descent, and also maintains Italian citizenship.  She studied composition at the National University of Rosario in Argentina with Dante Grela, Francisco Kröpfl, and Franco Donatoni. She also studied in Milan, Biella and Academy Chigi of Siena, studying with Georgy Ligeti, Ennio Morricone and Henri Pousseur. She was artist-in-residence at the Virginia Center for the Creative Arts in the United States.

After receiving her degree, Pavia worked as a composer and taught music at the Universidad Nacional de Rosario, Manuel de Falla Conservatory in Buenos Aires, Universidad del Museo Social Argentino and the Universidad del Salvador in Buenos Aires. Her music has been performed internationally.

Pavia has published articles in Codex XXI magazine, published by the Associació Música Tell (MIC) of Barcelona, and in Conceptos magazine, published by the Universidad del Museo Social Argentino (UMSA) in Buenos Aires. She has also published books of teaching repertoire.

Honors and awards
Marcela Pavia has won awards in competitions including:
7th International Paul Barson Guitar Composition Competition
Dundee Guitar Festival
6th Onde Musicali Composition Competition in Taranto
International Composition Competition
Execution for Percussion Instruments and Drums of the Percussive Arts Society 2007, Italy

Works
Pavia composes mostly for chamber ensemble and instruments. Selected works include:
De Puna y Pampas: Argentine folk music for two guitars
Suite Tupac Amaru for two guitars
Ondine for clarinet and bass, 2005
Dos para epigrafes El General Lavalle piano four hands, 2004
Shalott for 12 instruments, 1993
Fideal for solo guitar, 2005
Solentiname for clarinet and guitar
Nayla for solo flute

Discography
Portraits of Berben, contains "Fideal" and "Malambo" for solo guitar, IGS Bèrben of Ancona
Masterworks of the New Era Vol 7 Kiev Philharmonic Orchestra, ERMmedia (USA), contains "Sinclair" for flute, vibraphone, marimba and cello

References

1957 births
Living people
Argentine classical composers
Women classical composers
Musicians from Buenos Aires
20th-century classical composers
21st-century classical composers
20th-century women composers
21st-century women composers
Argentine women composers